The Nakajima Ki-87 was a Japanese high-altitude fighter-interceptor of World War II. It was a single seat, exhaust-driven turbo-supercharged engined, low-wing monoplane with a conventional undercarriage.

Design and development
The Ki-87 was developed in response to American B-29 Superfortress raids on the Home Islands. It followed up on earlier research by Nakajima and the Technical Division of Imperial Army Headquarters into boosting a large radial engine with an exhaust-driven turbo-supercharger, which had begun in 1942, well before the B-29 raids began. The efforts of the Technical Division of Imperial Army Headquarters eventually culminated into the Tachikawa Ki-94-I, while the Ki-87 was developed as a fall-back project, using less stringent requirements. Nakajima started in July 1943 with the construction of three prototypes, to be completed between November 1944 and January 1945, and seven pre-production aircraft, to be delivered by April 1945. The Technical Division of Imperial Army Headquarters made itself felt during the development of the Ki-87 prototype when they insisted upon placing the turbo-supercharger in the rear-fuselage, and from the sixth prototype the Nakajima fighter was to have that arrangement. The Ki-87 had a rearward folding undercarriage to accommodate the storage of ammunition for the cannons, which were mounted in the wing.

Construction was delayed due to problems with the electrical undercarriage and the turbo-supercharger, and the first prototype was not completed until February 1945; it first flew in April, but only five test flights were completed, all with the undercarriage in the extended position.

A further variant, the Ki-87-II, powered by a 3,000 hp Nakajima Ha217 (Ha-46) engine and with the turbo-supercharger in the same position as the P-47 Thunderbolt, never went further than the drawing board.

Operational history
Production of 500 aircraft was planned, but the war ended before any more than the single prototype were built.

Aircraft markings
The sole completed prototype was in natural metal finish; some paintings show a black anti-glare area in front of the cockpit, but this is not seen on any of the known photographs of the plane. However, James P. Gallagher took a photo of the Ki-87 at the abandoned Japanese Army fighter base at Chofu after Japan's surrender. The photo clearly shows a black anti-glare area from the cockpit forward to the tip of the nose.

Specifications (Ki-87 prototype)

See also

References
Notes

Bibliography

  (new edition 1987 by Putnam Aeronautical Books, .)
 
 
 Unknown Author Famous Aircraft of the World, first series, no.76: Japanese Army Experimental Fighters (1). Japan: Bunrin-Do Co. Ltd., August 1976.

External links

Information (Japanese) plus illustration by Shigeo Koike

Ki-087, Nakajima
1940s Japanese experimental aircraft
Low-wing aircraft
Ki-087
Single-engined tractor aircraft
Aircraft first flown in 1945